The Widowmaker hill climb is an outdoor motorcycle sport event held annually and sometimes semi-annually in Croydon, Utah, United States.  It consists of two major professional competitions, the first being the motorcycle hill climb, which is held usually in the month of June of each year.  The second competition is the snowmobile hill climb, which is usually held in the month of January.  However, there are many more types of sub-competitions held, including competitions for amateur motorcyclist, ATV, and snowmobile riders. 

The Widowmaker has become a popular event, both on the local riding circuit, and nationally with pro-riders. This has been attributed to the mountain's  difficulty level.  Even in the highest levels of pro-circuit riders there have been 13 as of March 8, 2009 that have been able to summit the 1000 foot level, over the 6 years that the event has been held.

On March 8, 2009, MTV's Nitro Circus visited the Widowmaker.  Among the members of those who attempted to try to summit the 1000 foot mark was motocross legend Travis Pastrana.  Although Travis was unsuccessful in his attempt, it was "summitted" that day for only the 13th time in the mountain's history. The first rider to reach the top was Mike Gibbons in 1970, of Grants Pass, Oregon.

References

Morgan County, Utah
Motorcycle races